Ganwa is the name for the princely group that traditionally ruled Burundi. They formed a distinct social class that was neither Hutu nor Tutsi, although they were affiliated with the latter. They have launched several appeals to be recognized as a distinct socio-cultural grouping.

References

African traditional governments
Ethnic groups in Burundi
African dynasties
African nobility
Ganwa people